The O-Level (Ordinary Level) is a subject-based qualification conferred as part of the General Certificate of Education. It began in the United Kingdom and has been adopted, often with modifications, in several other countries.

Beginnings
In the United Kingdom, it was introduced in place of the School Certificate in 1951 as part of an educational reform alongside the more in-depth and academically rigorous A-Level (Advanced Level) in England, Wales and Northern Ireland. Those three jurisdictions replaced O-Level gradually with General Certificate of Secondary Education (GCSE) completely by 1988 and, the International General Certificate of Secondary Education (IGCSE) over time. The Scottish equivalent was the O-grade (replaced by the Standard Grade).

The AO-Level (Alternative Ordinary Level) was formerly available in most subject areas. Sometimes incorrectly known as the Advanced Ordinary Level, the AO-Level syllabus and examination both assumed a higher degree of maturity on the part of candidates, and employed teaching methods more commonly associated with A-Level study. The AO Level was discontinued, with final qualifications awarded in 1988.

The O-Level qualification is still awarded by CIE Cambridge International Examinations, the international counterpart of the British examination Board OCR (Oxford, Cambridge & Royal Society of Arts), in select locations, instead of or alongside the International General Certificate of Secondary Education qualifications. Both CIE and OCR have Cambridge Assessment as their parent organisation. The Cambridge O-Level has already been phased out and is no longer available in certain administrative regions.

Current usage

Bangladesh
 
In Bangladesh, the O-Level qualification is offered, with examinations conducted by Cambridge Assessment International Examinations (CAIE) under the board of British Council as well as by other curriculums such as International Baccalaureate. Both Pearson Edexcel and CAIE offer International GCSE qualifications. O-Level qualification has become a replacement for the matriculation qualification (SSC) offered by the Government boards of education. However, due to the high costs associated with O-Level qualifications, their reach is limited to middle to elite class families.

Brunei
In Brunei, the O-Level qualification is offered, with examinations conducted by Cambridge Assessment International Examinations (CAIE).

A number of subjects: English Language, English Literature, Bahasa Melayu (Malay language), Malay Literature, Islamic Religious Knowledge, Ulum al-Quran, Hafaz al-Quran, Tafsir al-Quran (Asas), History, Geography, Pure sciences (Physics, Chemistry and Biology), Arabic, Art and Design offer exam papers and syllabuses unique to Brunei. Additionally, the Mathematics (Syllabus D) subject previously offered an exam paper and a syllabus unique to Brunei, but this has since been retired and the regular syllabus used worldwide is offered. This is equivalent to secondary education now.

India
In India, Cambridge International Examinations (CIE) GCE Ordinary-Level qualifications are offered at private and international schools as an alternative to the conventional Indian School Certificate (ISC).

Malaysia
In Malaysia, the O-Level qualification is offered as the Sijil Pelajaran Malaysia (SPM, Malaysian Education Certificate), with examinations conducted by the Malaysian Examination Syndicate (Lembaga Peperiksaan Malaysia). The examinations were formerly conducted by the  University of Cambridge Local Examinations Syndicate (UCLES), which still advises the national examination board on standards.

The English Language subject was previously offered with an exam paper and a syllabus unique to Malaysia, but this Malaysia-specific qualification has since expired, and the regular English Language exam paper and syllabus used worldwide is now used within the country. The English paper is separately graded by the national examination board and UCLES, and both grades are displayed on the result slip.

Mauritius

In Mauritius, the O-Level qualification is awarded as part of the School Certificate, which is awarded upon successful completion of Form V in secondary school. The O-Level examinations are jointly conducted by the Mauritius Examinations Syndicate and the University of Cambridge Local Examinations Syndicate (UCLES). The International General Certificate of Secondary Education from Edexcel is also offered as an equivalent alternative qualification, for which exam registration may be done through the Mauritius Examinations Syndicate.

A number of subjects, including English Language, English Language (Syllabus B), History, Mathematics (Syllabus A), Mathematics (Syllabus D), offer exam papers and syllabuses unique to Mauritius. Additionally, the subject of Art and Design, the offering of which is restricted to a limited geographic region, is available in Mauritius.

Pakistan
The GCE O-Level qualification is offered in Pakistan by the CIE and conducted by the British Council. Due to the high costs associated with O Level Schooling, it is mostly opted by privileged citizens.

Seychelles
In Seychelles, the O-Level qualification is offered, with examinations conducted by Cambridge International Examinations (CIE). Some subjects are unique to Seychelles or have a format, curriculum, or syllabus that is unique to Seychelles.

Singapore

In Singapore, the O-Level qualification is offered jointly by Cambridge International Examinations (CIE) and the Singapore Ministry of Education. The examinations are mainly conducted by CIE, with select subject examinations conducted by the Singapore Ministry of Education, including select mother tongue subjects, such as Chinese, Malay, and Tamil, and humanities subject of Social Studies.

A number of subjects previously offered exam papers and syllabuses unique to Singapore, but these have since been retired or planned to be phased out. After taking O-levels, some Singapore students go on to GCE Advanced Level exams, which are also marked by Cambridge International Examinations. In 2024, the O levels as well as the N levels will be phased out for a new local examination.

Sri Lanka

The GCE Ordinary-Level qualification is offered by the British council of Sri Lanka School (BCS). Before, this qualification was jointly offered by Cambridge International Examinations and the Ministry of Education in Sri Lanka.

Zimbabwe
The GCE Ordinary-Level qualification is offered by the Zimbabwe School Examinations Council (ZIMSEC). Before, this qualification was jointly offered by Cambridge International Examinations and the Ministry of Education in Zimbabwe.

Former usage

Caribbean
The O-Level qualification was previously awarded in the Caribbean. However, many Caribbean countries have now switched to awarding Caribbean Secondary Education Certification (CSEC) qualifications based on successful completion of examinations administered by the Caribbean Examinations Council (CXC).

Hong Kong
The O-Level qualification was previously awarded in Hong Kong, along with the Hong Kong version of the A-Level qualification. However, this was replaced with the Hong Kong Certificate of Education Examination (HKCEE) which was then replaced with the Hong Kong Diploma of Secondary Education (HKDSE). The HKCEE was previously benchmarked against the O Levels for comparable subjects, but with the introduction of the International General Certificate of Secondary Education (IGCSE) qualification the Hong Kong equivalent qualification was then benchmarked against the IGCSE.

United Kingdom

The GCE O-Level qualification originated in the United Kingdom, where it was awarded as the secondary school-leaving qualification. It was primarily an examinations-based qualification, with a grading system that changed over the years. In the United Kingdom, the O-Level qualifications were replaced in 1988 with the General Certificate of Secondary Education (GCSE) and the International General Certificate of Secondary Education (IGCSE).

See also
 GCE Ordinary Level (International) (O-Level)
 GCE Ordinary Level (United Kingdom)
 Ordinary Level (Sri Lanka)
 Cambridge International Ordinary Level (Singapore)
 Cambridge International O-Level subjects
 Certificate of Secondary Education (CSE)
 Certificate of Secondary Education (United Kingdom)(CSE)
 General Certificate of Secondary Education (GCSE), which replaced the O Levels and CSE
 International General Certificate of Secondary Education (IGCSE), which is offered with or instead of O Levels internationally
 General Certificate of Education (GCE), which comprises O Levels and A-levels
 School certificate (SC), predecessor to the GCE O-Level and CSE qualifications
 School Certificate (United Kingdom)
 School Certificate (Australia) 
 School Certificate (New Zealand)

References 

Educational qualifications in England
Educational qualifications in Northern Ireland
Educational qualifications in Wales
Secondary education in England
Secondary education in Northern Ireland
Secondary education in Wales
Secondary school qualifications